CHEF-FM is a Canadian radio station. Owned by Radio Matagami, the station broadcasts a community radio format at 99.9 FM in Matagami, Quebec. The station was licensed by the Canadian Radio-television and Telecommunications Commission in 2000.

CHEF also has a rebroadcaster, broadcasting on 96.9 FM with the call sign CHEF-FM-3, in Lebel-sur-Quévillon. The station applied to the CRTC in 2006 to add a transmitter at Chibougamau, but was denied because this would have had a negative impact on the financial viability of Chibougamau's CKXO-FM, due to the small size of the market.

The station is a member of the Association des radiodiffuseurs communautaires du Québec.

References

External links
CHEF-FM
 

Hef
Hef
Hef
Radio stations established in 2000
2000 establishments in Quebec